The Alliance of Democrats (SD) is a Polish centrist party.  Initially formed in 1937, the party underwent a revival in 2009, when it was joined by liberal politician Paweł Piskorski, formerly a member of Civic Platform.

History

Formation (1937-1939)
The Alliance of Democrats has its origins in the Democratic Clubs, which were opposed to authoritarian and nationalistic tendencies in the Second Republic of Poland between the two World Wars (1919–1939). The first club was founded in Warsaw in September 1937, and by 1938 there were clubs in all major urban centres, with active participation of the co-founders of Polish independence, whose primary objective was ensuring a fully democratic political system in Poland. The national founding convention of the Alliance of Democrats was held on 15 April 1939. The Declaration of Policy included such issues as improvement of the national economy, a development plan to raise the level of education, and modernisation of the armed forces. Mieczysław Michałowicz, a member of the Senate, was appointed the first party leader of the Alliance.

World War II years (1939-1945)
During World War II, a significant number of Alliance members were involved in the anti-Nazi Polish underground. One of its major leader was active in the Vila Ghetto. It was partly due to their initiative that Żegota, the Council for Aid to Jews, was founded in 1942 as well as the Social Organisation for Self-Defence. The Alliance of Democrats and other political and social organisations set up the Association of Democrats, which then entered the Council of National Unity, the Polish Underground State Parliament. In 1943 SD split into two factions, one of which supported the Polish Government-in-Exile in London, and the second co-operated with the communist Polish Workers' Party and recognized the State Country Council as the actual parliament and the Provisional Government of National Unity as the actual government of Poland. In 1945, following the Red Army seizure of Poland, two members of the Association, Eugeniusz Czarnowski and Stanisław Michałowski, were arrested by the NKVD and tried in the Stalinist-orchestrated Trial of the Sixteen, aimed at eliminating non-communist Polish political leadership.

The London faction ceased to exist in 1945.

During Communism (1946-1988)
In the People's Republic of Poland SD became a "satellite" party of the communist Polish United Workers' Party (PZPR) regime (similar parties existed in East Germany and Czechoslovakia). Even so, the party managed to sustain its non-Marxist orientation.

At their 12th Convention in 1981, the Alliance put forward proposals to establish a Tribunal of State, a Constitutional Tribunal, an Ombudsman Office, and to restore the Senate. Furthermore, the convention suggested that 3 May, the anniversary of the Constitution of 3 May 1791, should become a national holiday, as it had always been for the Alliance of Democrats. After martial law was declared in Poland in 1981, a group of MPs representing the Alliance, Hanna Suchocka, Dorota Simonides and Jan Janowski among them, voted against abolishing the Solidarity Trade Union. Some Alliance members became engaged in the activities of the anti-Communist underground opposition.

Fall of Communism and post-communist era (1989-2009)
In 1989 representatives of the Alliance of Democrats participated actively in the Round Table negotiations. Following the elections of 4 June, the Alliance, with the United People's Party and the Solidarity Civic Parliamentary Club, formed a coalition, supporting the government of Tadeusz Mazowiecki as Prime Minister, the first democratic government since 1939. Three Alliance members were nominated to governmental posts: Jan Jankowski as Deputy Prime Minister, Aleksander Mackiewicz as Domestic Market Minister and as Minister of Communications, Marek Kucharski, who is today the Secretary General of the Alliance. At the motion of the parliamentary party of the Alliance, the anniversary of the Constitution of 3 May was proclaimed a national holiday, the state again assumed "Republic of Poland" as its name, and an eagle wearing a crown was restored as the national emblem.

After 1990, most of the members of the SD joined other parties, such as the Freedom Union. The party continued to exist, but had only a small support base, and was not represented in the Polish parliament.

Rebirth after 2009
Due to the financial considerations required under the Polish political system, parties need to have sufficient funding to finance large-scale campaigns if they are new or have recently obtained under 3% of voters' support. The Democratic Party possessed a large number of properties, which made it possible to finance several political campaigns after sale of these properties. The value of its assets is estimated at PLN 65 to 250 million, as the Rzeczpospolita newspaper calculated.

After 2009 new politicians joined the party, such as centrist-conservative Paweł Piskorski. The party restored their representation in parliament, by taking over of the members of the Democratic Party – demokraci.pl group consisting of three members (including Marian Filar, Bogdan Lis and Jan Widacki). After Paweł Piskorski rise to the leadership of the party many of its old members of party resigned from being members of SD. In the 2009 European Elections, the party's candidates obtained 0.027% of votes because of registration problems and lack of organisation. Since May 2009 the Alliance of Democrats has been a member of the European Democratic Party. SD supported former Minister of Foreign Affairs Andrzej Olechowski's candidature in the 2010 presidential election. In the 2011 parliamentary elections Alliance did not register any lists but three candidates who were enlisted on the Poland Comes First election list but were supported by SD received 0,0031% of votes. The Party was to announce its new political programme at its XXVI Congress.

Before the 2019 European election SD declared its desire to join the European Coalition, however, none of the party members were on its electoral list.
Before the 2019 parliamentary election SD joined the Polish Coalition. Several members were on the PSL list, but they had not won any seats in the Sejm.

Chairmen of the party since 1939 
1939–1940 Mieczysław Michałowicz
1940–1942 Stanisław Więckowski
1942–1943 Mieczysław Bilek
1943–1944 Jerzy Makowiecki
1944–1945 Erazm Kulesza
1945–1949 Wincenty Rzymowski
1949–1956 Wacław Barcikowski
1956–1969 Stanisław Kulczyński
1969–1973 Zygmunt Moskwa
1973–1976 Andrzej Benesz
1976–1981 Tadeusz Witold Młyńczak
1981–1985 Edward Kowalczyk (politician)
1985–1989 Tadeusz Witold Młyńczak
1989–1990 Jerzy Jóźwiak
1990–1991 Aleksander Mackiewicz
1991–1992 Zbigniew Adamczyk
1992–1994 Rafał Szymański
1994–1998 Jan Janowski
1998–2002 Jan Klimek
2002–2006 Andrzej Arendarski
2006–2009 Krzysztof Góralczyk
2009–  Paweł Piskorski

Electoral history

Sejm elections

References

External links

1937 establishments in Poland
Centrist parties in Poland
European Democratic Party
Liberal parties in Poland
Political parties established in 1937